Songari is a village in the Mandsaur district of the Indian state Madhya Pradesh. Renowned International artist Wajid Khan hails from the same village.

References 

Villages in Mandsaur district